Madonna of the Orange Tree (Italian - Madonna dell'Arancio) is a 1496-1498 oil on panel painting by Cima da Conegliano. It was originally produced for the church of Santa Chiara in Murano, from which it was confiscated for the Gallerie dell'Accademia in Venice, where it now hangs.

Gallery

References

Bibliography
 Stefano Zuffi, Il Quattrocento, Electa, Milano 2004. ISBN 8837023154
 Ugo Carmeni, "Madonna dell'arancio, un'analisi alla rovescia", Venezia, 2010, (consultazione online)

Paintings in the Gallerie dell'Accademia
1490s paintings
Paintings of the Madonna and Child by Cima da Conegliano
Paintings of Jerome
Paintings of Louis of Toulouse